Segundo (Spanish for "second") is the second studio album by Argentine musician Juana Molina. It was named Best World Music Album 2003 by Entertainment Weekly.

Track listing

References

2000 albums
Albums recorded in a home studio
Juana Molina albums
Spanish-language albums